The canton of Bouxwiller is an administrative division of the Bas-Rhin department, northeastern France. Its borders were modified at the French canton reorganisation which came into effect in March 2015. Its seat is in Bouxwiller.

It consists of the following communes:

Alteckendorf
Berstett
Bosselshausen
Bossendorf
Bouxwiller
Buswiller
Dingsheim
Dossenheim-Kochersberg
Duntzenheim
Durningen
Ettendorf
Fessenheim-le-Bas
Furdenheim
Geiswiller-Zœbersdorf
Gougenheim
Grassendorf
Griesheim-sur-Souffel
Handschuheim
Hochfelden
Hohfrankenheim
Hurtigheim
Ingenheim
Issenhausen
Ittenheim
Kienheim
Kirrwiller
Kuttolsheim
Lixhausen
Melsheim
Minversheim
Mutzenhouse
Neugartheim-Ittlenheim
Obermodern-Zutzendorf
Obersoultzbach
Pfulgriesheim
Quatzenheim
Ringendorf
Rohr
Schalkendorf
Scherlenheim
Schnersheim
Schwindratzheim
Stutzheim-Offenheim
Truchtersheim
Uttwiller
Val-de-Moder (partly)
Waltenheim-sur-Zorn
Wickersheim-Wilshausen
Willgottheim
Wilwisheim
Wingersheim-les-Quatre-Bans
Wintzenheim-Kochersberg
Wiwersheim

References

Cantons of Bas-Rhin